is a Japanese businessman who currently serves as Chairman and CEO of Shinsei Bank and as a director of China Construction Bank.

He attended Kyoto University, graduating with a degree in law, and graduate school at the University of Tokyo. He joined Standard Vacuum Oil Company in 1958 and became a director of Esso Petroleum in 1964. He was appointed Japan chairman of Citibank in 1989.

In 1999, he left Citibank to head the Ripplewood-backed effort to acquire the Long-Term Credit Bank of Japan. In 2000, he was appointed Chairman and CEO of the newly acquired and renamed Shinsei Bank. In 2004 he was also appointed as a director of China Construction Bank. He resigned as CEO of Shinsei in 2005 and as chairman in 2006, but returned as Chairman and CEO in 2008.

References

External links 

Japanese businesspeople
1929 births
People from Shinagawa
Living people